John Carne Bidwill (5 February 1815 – 16 March 1853) was an English botanist who documented plant life in New Zealand and Australia. He is attributed with the discovery of several Australian plant species.

Life in England
Bidwill was born at St. Thomas, Exeter, England, the eldest son of Joseph Green Bidwill, a merchant of Exeter and Charlotte, née Carne. He was educated for a commercial life but developed an interest in science, and botany in particular. He sailed to Canada in April 1832 at 17 years of age, returning in November 1834.

Migration
In September 1838 John Bidwill arrived in Sydney, Australia, and while waiting for the survey of land that he had been allotted, he joined a commercial firm. He was sent in a schooner to New Zealand, arriving at the Bay of Islands on 5 February 1839. Over the next two months he took a journey into the interior of the North Island collecting botanical and other scientific specimens. He sent the plants he collected to John Lindley, although Lindley never published them. An account of this journey, Rambles in New Zealand, was published in London in 1841. He stated that "these rambles were abruptly put an end to by the increasing business of the mercantile firm at Sydney with which I am connected", but he returned to New Zealand in 1840 and spent some time at Port Nicholson and its neighbourhood. In July 1841 he met Joseph Dalton Hooker who, in his Introductory Essay to the Flora of Tasmania, mentions that Bidwill accompanied him "in my excursions round Port Jackson and impressed me deeply with the extent of his knowledge and fertile talents".

Richard Clough considers Bidwill was the first to introduce plant breeding to Australia. Bidwill worked with both native and exotic plants, and in 1843, he released his first hybrid, which was a hybrid between two Australian plants – Hibiscus splendens and H. heterophyllus – which he named ‘Hibiscus Sydneyi’. The hybrid belladonna lilies derived from Amaryllis belladonna and Brunsvigia spp., which are now grown all over the world, were first raised by him in 1841.

Public service

Bidwill returned to Sydney in 1844 and spent a year from February 1845 in Tahiti.
Bidwill became temporary government botanist on 1 September 1847 and inaugural Director of Sydney's botanic gardens.  The gardens were established in 1816 and until that time had been supervised by colonial botanists and superintendents. Bidwill was succeeded by the permanent Director Charles Moore, who arrived in Australia and took up his duties in January 1848.

Following his brief time as interim Director of the botanic gardens, Bidwill was appointed commissioner of crown lands and chairman of the bench of magistrates for the district of Wide Bay in what is now Queensland.

Plant discoveries

Bidwill brought a live specimen to London where it was studied and named Araucaria bidwillii after him by English botanist William Jackson Hooker in the 1843 London Journal of Botany.  Bidwill also is credited with discovery of Agathis robusta (the Dammara or Queensland kauri pine) and the Nymphaea gigantea.

Death
In 1851, while marking out a new road to the Moreton Bay district, Bidwill became separated from his colleagues and was lost without food for eight days. He eventually succeeded in cutting a way through the scrub with a pocket hook, but never properly recovered from starvation, and died on 16 March 1853 at Tinana, at 38 years of age. His grave at Cran Street, Tinana, has been listed on the Queensland Heritage Register. A Bunya pine was planted at each corner of his grave to mark its position.

His brother Charles Bidwill came from New Zealand to collect his personal effects, all other items of Bidwill's were auctioned. In 1854 Sir Charles Moore and Walter Hill (curator of Brisbane Botanical Gardens) made a collection of specimens from Bidwill's personal garden. Surviving trees from the collection are thought to be a Bunya Pine and Sausage Tree in Queen's Park, Maryborough. Other specimens were sent to Brisbane, Rockhampton and Ipswich.

Legacy
In addition to Araucaria bidwillii, scientific name for the Bunya Bunya tree, Bidwill is remembered in the name of the City of Blacktown suburb, Bidwill, New South Wales.
In Queensland, a parish, a locality and a creek also bear his name, in recognition of his term as Commissioner for Crown Lands, Wide Bay.

Ten Australian and three New Zealand plant species are also named after him. Altogether thirty plants carry his name.

See also
 Commissioner Bidwill's Grave

References

Additional sources listed by the Australian Dictionary of Biography:
J. H. Maiden, 'Records of Australian Botanists: Bidwell, John Carne (1815-1853)', Journal and Proceedings of the Royal Society of New South Wales, vol 42, 1908, pp 85–93; 
W. W. Froggatt, 'The Curators and Botanists of the Botanic Gardens, Sydney', Journal and Proceedings (Royal Australian Historical Society), vol 18, part 3, 1932, pp 101–133.

External links 

 

1815 births
1853 deaths
English botanists
Botanists active in Australia
Botanists active in New Zealand